Người bí ẩn is a Vietnamese comedy panel game show based on British ITV's Odd One In, produced by Đông Tây Promotion and broadcast on the HTV. It is starred by comedians Việt Hương and Hoài Linh in role of regular Home Team (aka Husband & Wife). The first season of the show debuted on March 30, 2014. 13 episodes were ordered and 26 celebrities were invited to act as 13 Away Teams.

Format
Two teams take on a guessing game with a series of unusual, unlikely and often unbelievable line-ups. The celebrity teams have to work out who in each line up has the odd skill, talent or secret. The teams are allowed to ask questions to the line up, to determine which of the number of available choice is the Odd One In. The fifth and final round features familiar faces from the previous rounds where a member of each of the previous rounds return for one last Odd One In. At the end of the games, the winning team was awarded a cash prize by multiplying scores from both teams by 5,000,000 VND.

Overview

Original series

Episode details

External links
List of television programmes broadcast by HTV
Người bí ẩn on YouTube

Television series by Endemol
2010s Vietnamese television series
2014 Vietnamese television series debuts
2014 Vietnamese television series endings